Dear Husband is a collection of 14 fictional short stories written by Joyce Carol Oates.  It was published in 2009.

Description
The book is made up of a collection of 14 stories, all of which have been previously published.  The book is broken up into two parts.

Stories

Part 1
Panic - Originally published in Michigan Quarterly Review.  A family deals with their reactions to a potentially deadly situation.
Special - Originally published in Boulevard.  Details a girl growing up with an older autistic sister who has disfigured her.
The Blind Man's Sighted Daughters - Originally published in Fiction (magazine).  A grown woman struggles to deal with her aged father and the knowledge that he is a murderer.
Magada Maria - Originally published in Timothy McSweeney's Quarterly Concern.  A story of a woman's slow downward spiral over the years, told from her last boyfriend's point of view.
A Princeton Idyll - Originally published in The Yale Review.  Story told in a series of letters between a woman and a housekeeper regarding the woman's grandfathers death and dissolution of the family.
Cutty Sark - Originally published in Salmagundi (magazine).  A man deals with the pressure of having a famous incestuous mother.
Landfill - Originally published in The New Yorker.  Murder mystery centered on a young man's death at a fraternity house.
Vigilante - Originally published in Boulevard.  Home from college the protagonist struggles with drug addiction and an abusive father.
The Heart Sutra - Originally published in American Short Fiction.  Two famous poets deal with separation from each other in vastly different fashion.

Part 2
Dear Joyce Carol - Originally published in Boulevard.  A series of, fictional, letters written to the author by a stalker.
Suicide by Fitness Center - Originally published in Harper's Magazine.  Depressed a woman attempts suicide at a fitness center.
The Glazers - Originally published in American Short Fiction.  Meeting the family of her boyfriend a woman discovers a dark secret.
Mistrial - Originally published in Storie.  Retired librarian is on a jury, but has a secret motive.
Dear Husband - Originally Published in Conjunctions.  The titular story of the collection.  A short final letter from a wife to her husband.

References

2009 short story collections
Ecco Press books